Bušeča Vas is a village on the right bank of the Krka River in the Municipality of Brežice in eastern Slovenia. The area is part of the traditional region of Lower Carniola. It is now included with the rest of the municipality in the Lower Sava Statistical Region.

The local church is dedicated to Our Lady of Sorrows and belongs to the Parish of Sveti Križ–Podbočje. It is a Gothic church that contains mid-15th century frescos. The nave was reconstructed and repainted in the 17th century. The belfry dates to 1601.

References

External links
Bušeča Vas on Geopedia

Populated places in the Municipality of Brežice